Radioactive Sago Project is a Filipino jazz rock band formed in 1997 in Quezon City, Philippines. The band's sound is a fusion of spoken-word poetry, bebop jazz, and punk. Subjects in their material range from politics, drugs, alcohol, random musings and current issues.

Fronted by award-winning poet Lourd de Veyra, the band has released four albums. The first, a self-titled album, was released under Viva Records in 2000. This was followed by Urban Gulaman in 2004 and Tangina Mo Andaming Nagugutom sa Mundo Fashionista Ka Pa Rin in 2007 and Ang Itlog at ang Demonyo in 2014, all under Terno recordings.

Career
In 2000, the band released its first single, "Gusto Ko Ng Baboy", about a young man's fascination with pigs since his childhood. As the song progresses, it becomes a political tirade against corruption.

In 2004, they released the single "Astro", from Urban Gulaman, depicting a person's addiction to cigarette smoking. This was titled after Astro, a now-defunct, cheap brand of cigarettes sold in impoverished areas. The song was used in the Pinoy/Blonde soundtrack the following year. A second single entitled "Alaala ni Batman" was also released. It tells the story of a man's idolization of Batman since his childhood. The song progresses into ruminations on politics and society, and how these factors contribute to the demise of Philippine economy and society. At the end of the song, the persona jumps off the top of a building believing he could fly, only to realize that Batman cannot fly.

In 2005, the band received three nominations at the MTV Pilipinas Video Music Awards for Favorite Group, Best Video, and Best Director (R.A. Rivera). The band won Best Video, and Best Director (R.A. Rivera).

Discography

Studio albums
The Radioactive Sago Project - Viva Records, 2000
Urban Gulaman - Terno Recordings, 2004
Tangina Mo Andaming Nagugutom sa Mundo Fashionista Ka Pa Rin - Terno Recordings, 2007
Ang Itlog at ang Demonyo - Terno Recordings, 2014

Compilation albums
Supersize Rock (Warner Music Philippines, 2004)
Ultraelectromagneticjam!: The Music Of The Eraserheads (Sony BMG Music Philippines, 2005)
The Best Of Manila Sound: Hopia Mani Popcorn (Viva Records, 2006)
Environmentally Sound: A Select Anthology of Songs Inspired by the Earth (World Wildlife Fund, Ayala Land, 2006)
Kami nAPO Muna Ulit (Universal Records, 2007)
Huling Balita: Songs for the Disappeared (Free Jonas Burgos Movement, 2008)

Members
Lourd de Veyra - vocals
Francis De Veyra - bass
Jay Gapasin - drums
Junji Lerma - guitar
Wowie Ansano - trumpet
Pards Tupas - trombone
Roxy Modesto - saxophone
Rastem Eugenio - saxophone
Arwin Nava - percussion
B-Boy Garcia - turntables

Past members
EJ Delgado - guitars
Josefa Alovera - saxophone
Ryan Zapanta - saxophone
Jed Punongbayan - Piano
Julie J. Julie- Synth

Singles and music videos
"Gusto ko ng Baboy (Jovelyn Laborte)" 
"Astro" (TEN: The Evening News, Theme song of the TV5 News program from 2008–2010)
"Gin Pomelo"
"Panic Buying Sa Duljo"
"Hello Hello"
"Wasak na Wasak"
"Kapalaran" (original by Rico J. Puno)
"Alaala ni Batman"
"Alkohol" (original by Eraserheads)
"Syotang Pa-Class" (original by APO Hiking Society)
"Alak, Sugal, Kape, Babae, Kabaong"
"Trip" ("Recorded from Tower Sessions")
"Super Hatdog"
"Bosnots & Friends"

Awards and nominations

References

External links
Radioactive Sago Project website

Filipino jazz ensembles
Filipino rock music groups
Musical groups from Quezon City
Musical groups established in 1999
Satirists
1999 establishments in the Philippines